Simu Liu (born 19 April 1989) is a Canadian actor. He is known for portraying Shang-Chi in the 2021 Marvel Cinematic Universe film Shang-Chi and the Legend of the Ten Rings. He also played Jung Kim in the CBC Television sitcom Kim's Convenience and received nominations at the ACTRA Awards and Canadian Screen Awards for his work in Blood and Water.

In 2022, Liu authored the memoir We Were Dreamers, and was named one of Times 100 most influential people in the world.

Early life 
Liu was born in Harbin, China, on 19 April 1989, son of Zhenning and Zheng Liu. His parents met while attending university in Beijing, where they both studied engineering. His father, Zhenning, went to the United States to study for a PhD whilst his mother worked in Beijing, and Liu was raised until age 5 by his grandparents in Harbin, China, "in a small apartment, without running water for much of the day", in circumstances he recalled as "idyllic and happy". His parents later emigrated with him to Canada, where they supplemented their scholarships with dish-washing jobs and eventually became successful aerospace engineers; Liu was raised in Mississauga, Ontario.

In his memoir, We Were Dreamers, he wrote of the deprivation and trauma his parents had experienced growing up in China's Cultural Revolution, and their subsequent "tiger parenting" style, saying he felt they "wanted to rid [his] life of joy or happiness", and recalling "the weight of what he describes as impossible expectations, 'to be the star child, the studious academic, the obedient son'", being "belittled and physically punished" for perceived failings. Liu's parents "hothoused him in maths at the age of five and set 'homework' that included reading biographies of scientists and studying algebra". He attended University of Toronto Schools for high school and studied business administration at the Ivey Business School at the University of Western Ontario, graduating with honours in 2011.

Liu initially worked as an accountant at Deloitte but was laid off in April 2012 after nine months. He began to explore other career options and decided to pursue a career as an actor and stuntman. Liu became distant from his parents after losing his accounting job and entering acting, but after discussing his memories of childhood with his parents, the family reconciled and became closer as a result.

Career

2012–2018: Early work and television roles
Liu got his start in acting working as an extra and stuntman, appearing in movies and music videos such as Guillermo del Toro's Pacific Rim and Avicii's "I Could Be the One." His other early onscreen credits include Nikita (2012) and Beauty and the Beast (2014). He appeared as a stuntman in Sick: Survive the Night (2012) and the TV miniseries Heroes Reborn.

In 2015, Liu was cast in his first significant recurring role, appearing as a series regular in seven episodes of the Omni Television crime drama series Blood and Water (2015–2016). He would later receive his first award nominations for this role at the ACTRA Awards and Canadian Screen Awards in 2017.

Later in 2015, Liu was cast in his first main role as Jung Kim in the CBC Television sitcom Kim's Convenience, a TV adaptation of the play of the same name. It remains his most notable television success to date, with the series being nominated for and winning multiple awards internationally, including Best Comedy Series at the 2018 Canadian Screen Awards and "Most Popular Foreign Drama" at the 2019 Seoul International Drama Awards. Liu starred in the series until its conclusion in 2021.

In 2016, Liu was cast in a recurring role as the ex-CIA analyst Faaron, loosely modeled on real-life ex-analyst Rodney Faraon, in the NBC prequel series Taken based on the film franchise starring Liam Neeson.

Even as he was cast in main and recurring roles, Liu continued to appear as an extra on several television shows, appearing in an episode of the hit BBC-Space series Orphan Black as well as in the Canadian science fiction series Dark Matter.

In 2017, Liu appeared in the second season of Slasher as well as the CityTV miniseries Bad Blood, both as recurring characters.

In 2018, he appeared in the science fiction television series The Expanse and Wong Fu Productions' YouTube series Yappie.

2019–present: Recent work and Marvel Cinematic Universe 

In early 2019, Liu guest-starred in the 100th episode of ABC's Fresh Off the Boat as a noodle vendor named Willie. He also guest-starred in an episode of the TV series Awkwafina Is Nora from Queens as Garbage Boy.

At Comic-Con 2019, Disney announced that Liu would play the titular superhero Shang-Chi in the film Shang-Chi and the Legend of the Ten Rings, which is set in the Marvel Cinematic Universe (MCU). Shang-Chi and the Legend of the Ten Rings is Marvel's first film with an Asian-led cast. Liu had asked about playing the role on Twitter in December 2018 when the movie was revealed to be in development. After several production and release delays due to the COVID-19 pandemic, the film was released in theaters on 3 September 2021, garnering positive critical reception and achieving commercial success. A sequel is planned.

In September 2021, it was revealed that Liu will lead the English-language voice cast of Bright: Samurai Soul, a Netflix anime film which premiered on 12 October. In February 2022, Liu joined the cast of Greta Gerwig's Barbie film for Warner Bros. and thriller film Hello Stranger directed by April Mullen.

Both Liu and NBA player Jeremy Lin had guest appearances as caricaturized versions of themselves in Malaysian comedian Ronny Chieng's Netflix short Ronny Chieng Takes Chinatown (2022). In December 2022, Liu was a guest narrator at Disney's Candlelight Processional.

Other work and public image 
In 2014, Liu was paid $100 to model for a set of stock photos for FatCamera; the photos appeared in subway stations, advertisements, storefronts, pamphlets, and textbook covers. The photos received widespread media coverage upon Liu's mainstream acting breakthrough in 2021.

Liu is also a filmmaker, producer, and writer. Liu's first work in this area was Open Gym, a short film he wrote, directed, produced, and starred in that debuted at the 2013 Toronto Reel Asian International Film Festival. He has directed, produced, and written several other shorts, including Crimson Defender vs. The Slightly Racist Family (2015). In 2016, Liu helped write Blood and Water, during which he helped break the story for the show and wrote an episode for its second season. In 2017, Liu worked with Wong Fu Productions on their short Meeting Mommy (2017), which he wrote and produced with Tina Jung. It was released in February 2018 on the Wong Fu Productions YouTube channel. In 2018, he founded his own film production company, 4:12 Entertainment, and began developing long-form film projects under it.

In December 2017, Liu wrote for Maclean's magazine about his experiences growing up in an immigrant family. The article appeared in the January 2018 issue. His memoir, We Were Dreamers: An Immigrant Superhero Origin Story, was published by HarperCollins on 17 May 2022. In March 2021, Liu published a column in Variety detailing the effects of Asian hate crimes and how "rhetoric like 'the China virus' encourages hate toward all Asian people—not just Chinese."

Liu was included on Time magazine's annual list of the 100 most influential people in the world in 2022. Liu was named one of 's 50 Most Beautiful Canadians and 25 Hottest Bachelors in 2017 and 2018. In May 2021, Liu became the first East Asian man to cover Men's Health magazine in over a decade since Jet Li in 2010. In November 2021, Liu became the fourth actor of Chinese descent to host Saturday Night Live. He hosted the Juno Awards of 2022 ceremony in May 2022.

Accolades 
Liu was nominated for a Canadian Screen Award and an ACTRA Award in 2017 for his work in Blood and Water. He, along with his Kim's Convenience castmates, won the ACTRA Award for Outstanding Ensemble in 2017. Liu and his castmates were nominated for the same award in 2018 and 2019. Kim's Convenience also won the award for Best Comedy Series at the 2018 Canadian Screen Awards.

On stage, Liu was nominated for a Dora Mavor Moore Award in the Outstanding Ensemble category alongside his castmates in the 2016 Factory Theatre remount of the play Banana Boys.

In January 2023, he was named the winner of the Academy of Canadian Cinema and Television's Radius Award at the 11th Canadian Screen Awards.

Filmography

Film

Television

Music videos

Awards and nominations

References

External links 

 
 
 

1989 births
21st-century Canadian male actors
Canadian Buddhists
Canadian male actors of Chinese descent
Canadian male film actors
Canadian male television actors
Canadian male voice actors
Canadian male television writers
Canadian television writers
Chinese emigrants to Canada
Chinese Buddhists
Living people
Male actors from Harbin
Male actors from Ontario
University of Western Ontario alumni
Writers from Mississauga